The 2013–14 season was PAOK Football Club's 88th in existence and the club's 55th consecutive season in the top flight of Greek football. The team will enter the Greek Football Cup in the Third Round and will also compete in UEFA Champions League starting from the Third qualifying round.

On 14 June 2013, Huub Stevens signed a two-year contract to become PAOK's manager.

Players

Current squad

Last updated: 3 February 2014 
Source: Squad at PAOK FC official website

Transfers

In

Out

Last updated: 1 February 2014

Managerial and Medical Staff

Kit

|
|
|
|
|

Friendly matches

Competitions

Overall

Last updated: 20 February 2014

Overview

Managerial statistics

Superleague

League table

Results

Results by round

Matches

 PAOK

Play-offs

Table

Matches

Greek Football Cup

Second round

Third round

Quarter-finals

Semi-finals

Final

UEFA Champions League

Third qualifying round 

UEFA decided to replace Metalist Kharkiv with PAOK after they were disqualified from UEFA competitions for match fixing.

Play-off Round

UEFA Europa League

Group stage

AZ  and PAOK qualified to the Knockout Phase (round 32)

Knockout phase

Round of 32

Statistics

Squad statistics

Goalscorers
All goals

Disciplinary record

References

External links
 PAOK FC official website

PAOK FC seasons
PAOK FC season